Hargan may refer to:
Hargan, Iran, a village in Fars Province
Eric Hargan (born 1968), American civil servant
Gerry Hargan, Irish Gaelic footballer
Sean Hargan (born 1974), Northern Ireland footballer
Steve Hargan (born 1942), American baseball player